Noman Group is one of the largest Bangladeshi conglomerates in the textiles and garments sector. Its companies export annually about $1 billion in textile and garment products around the world, and employ about 70,000 people. Noman Group produces yarns, fabrics, home textile, bed covers, curtain, comforters, quilt covers, denim and towels.

Noman Group customers are IKEA, Target Corporation, GAP Inc., JC Penney, Tesco, Li & Fung, American Eagle Outfitters, Carrefour, The Walt Disney Company, Nike, Zara, Mango, Uniqlo, Walmart, Kmart, PVH, Nitori, Esprit Holdings, and HEMA.

History
It was established in 1997. It was the largest vertically integrated textile group of companies in Bangladesh. In 2011, Noman Group opened six textile factories; by that time, the company was operating 19 plants employing about 40,000 people.

Noman Group targeted to export 180 million USD export in 2009.

In 2012, Noman opened a towel factory.

By 2015, the company operated 28 factories, and another five new plants were under development. Compliance is an important area where the group focuses on the most, Islam said. “I had to spend Tk 300 crore to set up an effluent treatment plant.” In November, the Institute of Textile Engineers and Technologists and the Engineers Institute of Bangladesh protested outside the Jatiya Press Club protesting the assault of an engineer of Noman Group by the managing director of the group. A case was filed accusing ASM Rafiqul Islam, managing director of Noman Group, and his sister and director of the group, Noor-e-Yesmin Fatima. They denied the accusation and said the engineer was assaulted by garment workers and that he had embezzled money from the group.

In 2016, the Group exported more than one billion USD in garments, the first company in Bangladesh to do so, and had 70 thousand employees. Noman Group exports to European Union, United States, Japan and Asian Countries.

The Group suffered production shutdowns in Tongi due a shortage of gas supplies in October 2017 according to deputy managing director Mohammad Abdullah Zaber. In December 2017, Noman Group reported that they were the victims of three highway robberies in the last one and a half year. According to Bangladesh Garment Manufacturers and Exporters Association highway robberies are a major concern for garment manufacturers.

Noman Group announced plans to invest five billion BDT to build a Coolmax All Season fabric manufacturing unit in April 2018.

Zaber and Zubair (Z&Z) Fabrics Limited, a sister concern of leading garment exporter Noman Group. In 2022, the Ministry of Home Affairs issued a notice that, Inspector General of Police Benazir Ahmed and two other officials are going to Germany on a 9-day visit to check the quality of 100,000 pieces of bed sheet for double cot and pillows for the police department. The contract worth 175 million BDT was won by Noman Group. The news f the trip caused a stir in the social media  which led to the cancelation of the trip. In November, the Group accused the editor of Daily Inqilab, AMM Bahauddin, and a reporter, Sayeed Ahmed, of defamation and sought 20 billion BDT in damages. The newspaper accused the group of embezzling 100 billion BDT in bank loans.

Subsidiaries 

 Noman Terry Towel Mills Limited
 Zaber & Zubair Fabrics
 Nice Denim Mills Limited
 Ismail Spinning Mills Limited
 Sufia Cotton Mills Limited
 Talha Spinning Mill Limited
 Yasmin Spinning Mills Limited
 Zaber Spinning Mills Limited
 Zubair Spinning Mills Limited
 Noman Fashion Fabrics Limited
 Noman Textile Mills Limited
 Noman Composite Textile Limited
 Ismail Textile Mills Limited
 Talha Fabrics Limited
 Zarba Textile Mills Limited
 Artex Fabrics Limited
 Marium Textile Mills
 Noman Home Textile Mills Limited
 Ismail Anjuman Ara Fabrics Limited
 Talha Tex Pro Limited
 Noman Fabrics Limited
 Zaber and Zubair Accessories Limited
 Ismail Anjuman Ara Trust
 Sufia Fabrics Limited

Awards 
HSBC Export Excellence Awards in 2012

National Export Trophy.

References 

Conglomerate companies of Bangladesh
Textile companies of Bangladesh
Manufacturing companies based in Dhaka
1997 establishments in Bangladesh
Textile mills